Tecuamburro is a stratovolcano in southern Guatemala, roughly 50 kilometres south east of Guatemala City. The Tecuamburro is an andesitic stratovolcano which formed approximately 38,000 years ago inside a horseshoe-shaped caldera formed by a structural failure in a second, 100,000-year-old stratovolcano, known as Miraflores. At the top of the Tecuamburro is an acidic crater lake around which many hot springs, fumaroles, and boiling mudpots are found.

See also
 List of volcanoes in Guatemala

References 
 

Mountains of Guatemala
Stratovolcanoes of Guatemala
Volcanic crater lakes
Volcano
Pleistocene stratovolcanoes
Holocene stratovolcanoes